Waiōhinu (translation: "Shiny Water") is an unincorporated community and census-designated place (CDP) in the district of Kau on the [[Hawaii (island)|Big Island of Hawaii']], in the U.S. state of Hawaii. Waiōhinu is the name of the community as well as the ahupua'a'', Native Hawaiian subdivision. As of the 2020 census, the CDP had a population of 198.

Demographics
As of the 2020 American Community Survey, Waiōhinu had a population of 220 residents, of whom 50 were Native Hawaiian or other Pacific Islanders, 39 were Asian, 31 were white, and 100 were two or more races. 21 residents were Hispanic or Latino of any race.

Location
Waiōhinu is at the far southern tip of the island of Hawaii, on Hawaii Route 11, which is part of the Hawaii Belt Road.

Waiohinu's ZIP code is 96772, which it shares with the nearby community of Nāālehu.

Landmarks
Mark Twain visited Waiōhinu in 1866 and, legend has it, planted a monkey pod tree (Albizia saman) here. The tree blew down in 1957, but a shoot from it was replanted, and remains growing there today.

Kauahaao Church was built in 1888 by Calvinist missionaries in Waiōhinu. The historic wooden church building was demolished in April 1998 because of extensive termite damage.

Wong Yuen Store was built in 1914 by Chinese immigrant Wong Yuen. It is currently the only store in operation in Waiōhinu.

Wong Yuen Store, in Waiohinu, closed on April 1, 2018. The largest employer in Waiohinu is now Pacific Quest, employing over 100.

References

Further reading
"Kauaha'ao demolition splits church" by Rod Thompson, "Honolulu Star-Bulletin" July 6, 1998
"Wai'ōhinu" Hawaiian Place Names

External links
Mark Twain's Monkey pod tree
More on Twain's tree
Waiohinu on Google Maps

Census-designated places in Hawaii County, Hawaii
Populated coastal places in Hawaii